Jubilee! was a Las Vegas Strip-based spectacular revue. It opened on July 31, 1981 at an initial cost of 10 million dollars and was originally produced by Donn Arden. Donn Arden set the standard for all the spectacular Las Vegas shows that celebrated female beauty, in combination with a demand for only the best; in costumes, set, and talent. When it closed in 2016, this resident show at Bally's Las Vegas was the longest-running production show in Las Vegas. The Jubilee! showgirls were an icon of old Vegas.  The show used costumes designed by Bob Mackie and Pete Menefee. UNLV Special Collections houses many of the original costume design drawings which can be accessed online through the Showgirls collection from UNLV Digital Collections. Many of the show's sets dated back to the original production and include the sinking of the Titanic and the bull used in Samson and Delilah. The bull was 27 feet (8 m) tall and collapses down to 13 feet (4 m) after it has been destroyed. The bull was the heaviest single piece of scenery in the show weighing 3 tons (2700 kg). It took 9 stagehands to move it from one position to another. Jubilee!'s longest serving principal dancer from the opening night until her departure 23 years later was Linda Green. The final closing cast consisted of 3 female singers, 3 male singers, 18 male dancers, 23 topless dancers, and 19 female dancers. Within the female covered and topless dancers, they were further categorized as "short" and "tall" dancers. A "short" dancer is a female dancer between 5 ft 8 in (173 cm) and 5 ft 9 in (175 cm) and a "tall" female dancer is between 5 ft 10 in (178 cm) and 6 ft 2 in (188 cm).  One may have been surprised at how tall the dancers were because of the proportions of the stage, which was three and a half stories high, giving the illusion that the performers are smaller in relationship to the stage.

The show ended its 35-year run on February 11, 2016.

Creators
 Donn Arden - Producer
 Fluff LeCoque - Associate producer
 Michael Pratt - Assistant company manager
 Winston Hemsley - Choreographer
 Rich Rizzo - Choreographer
 Pete Menefee - Designer
 Bob Mackie - Designer

Notable dancers
Tiffany Coyne, model
 Greta Jones, Full Show Swing
 Kaleigh Jones, Featured Dancer
 Michael Forsch, Line 3 Captain
 Nathaniel Burich, Full Show Swing
 Sabina Kelley, Tattooed Model
 Jessica Lane, Featured Dancer (Dolly Sister)
 Lisa Louise Wilson, Principle Singer, Singer Line Captain and Female Singer Swing

Acts
 Act 1 Showtime! Putting It into the Right Vernacular
 Act 2 A Specialty Act that varied over the years, toward the end was a hand balancing act
 Act 3 Samson and Delilah Tonight, a Lesson from Ancient History
 Act 4 Another Specialty Act that varied over the years, sometimes a magic act, towards the end was a gaucho act
 Act 5 Titanic Away We Go on the Mighty "Unsinkable" Ocean Liner
 Act 6 Another Specialty Act, towards the end was an aerial act
 Act 7 The Finale A Tribute to Fred Astaire and Ginger Rogers

Former staff at time of closing
 Damian Costa - Entertainment Director
 Diane Palm - Company manager
 Suzanne Swanson - Assistant company manager
 Darrell Clulow - Technical director
 Alicia Morse - Stage manager
 Amy Schrage - Assistant Stage manager
 Donna London - Wardrobe manager
 Gene Lubas - Show Manager
 Ryan Rappaport - Entertainment Manager
 Daniel Salas - Showroom Manager 
 Carol Beeman - Production assistant
 Ken Billington - Lighting Designer

Technical/show information

 At its closing date Jubilee! features a cast of 66 showgirls and show boys. When it first opened the cast had over 100 performers in it.
 The theater seated 1,033 people in a combination of theater style seats, swivel chairs, tables and booths.
 The show was topless, for 18 and over
 There were 75 stagehands working on the show.
 The total width of the stage wall to wall was 190 feet (58 m).
 All of the dressing rooms were in the basement, 2 flights of stairs below the stage, making for some dancers to do over 1,700 stairs a night.
 The heaviest set piece lifted by a motor weighed over 6,000 pounds (2,700 kg) and the heaviest set piece of scenery lifted and lowered by the crew weighed 4,000 pounds (1,800 kg).
 The sinking effect of the Titanic was achieved by a combination of the ship and the stage moving at the same time, creating a singular illusion.
 Over 1,000 costumes were designed for Jubilee! By Pete Menefee and Bob Mackie.
 The feathered headdresses worn by the showgirls weighed up to 35 pounds (15 kg).
 There were between 20 and 2,000 feathers on a single costume.
 Delilah's crown was the largest jeweled headpiece in the show.  The crown was 2 feet (60 cm) tall and is covered with 20 pounds (10 kg) of rhinestones.
 The costumes worn in the Grand Jewel Box Finale tribute to Florenz Ziegfeld, was designed by Bob Mackie.  There were 36 individual designs, each based on the jewel tones of amethyst, sapphire, emerald, and ruby.

See also
 Peepshow
 Sirens of TI
 Absinthe
 Moulin Rouge
 Le Lido
 Folies Bergère
 Casino de Paris
 Paradis Latin
 Cabaret Red Light
 Tropicana Club
 Crazy Horse (cabaret)

References

External links

 

1981 establishments in Nevada
Production shows in the Las Vegas Valley
2016 disestablishments in Nevada
Events in the Las Vegas Valley
Las Vegas shows